Richard Wahl (4 December 1906 – 1 November 1982) was a German fencer. He won a bronze medal in the team sabre event at the 1936 Summer Olympics.

References

1906 births
1982 deaths
German male fencers
Olympic fencers of Germany
Fencers at the 1936 Summer Olympics
Olympic bronze medalists for Germany
Olympic medalists in fencing
Medalists at the 1936 Summer Olympics